Restless Souls is a 1922 American silent drama film directed by Robert Ensminger and starring Earle Williams, Francelia Billington and Arthur Hoyt.

Cast
 Earle Williams as James Parkington
 Francelia Billington as Lida Parkington
 Arthur Hoyt as Edgar Swetson
 Martha Mattox as Mrs. Fortescue
 Nick Cogley as Uncle Ben

References

Bibliography
 Robert B. Connelly. The Silents: Silent Feature Films, 1910-36, Volume 40, Issue 2. December Press, 1998.

External links
 

1922 films
1922 drama films
1920s English-language films
American silent feature films
Silent American drama films
American black-and-white films
Vitagraph Studios films
Films directed by Robert Ensminger
1920s American films
English-language drama films